Paathshaala is a 2010 Indian drama film that stars Shahid Kapoor, Ayesha Takia, Shraddha Arya, Ali Haji, Sushant Singh and Nana Patekar and is directed by Milind Ukey. The story revolves around children on a school campus. It comments on the Indian education system and its shortcomings. Kapoor plays an English and music teacher. It is inspired by the Marathi film Shaala, also directed by Milind Ukey. Paathshaala opened on 16 April 2010.

Plot
The story begins with a new English teacher Rahul Prakash Udyavar joining Saraswati Vidya Mandir school, in the Mirpurkhas suburbs. He strikes instant rapport with students and teachers alike.

When Rahul Udyavar unifies the teachers against the atrocities of the school's management, Principal Aditya Sahay  defends the management's decision. This comes as a shocker to the teachers as Sahay is known for his dedication as an educator for the last 32 years who has built the school's high reputation.

The situation becomes graver as school management becomes overambitious with its growth and involves media planners in the extracurricular activities. This demands the involvement of students in TV reality shows and other media PR activities used for building the school's image in public which starts reflecting on the students' stress levels. The pressure on young minds increases incredibly, leading to unexpected and grim consequences.

Caught in the web of commercialization, the students go on strike unable to take the pressure, and it becomes a hectic situation. When the media comes to the school, asking questions about strike, Principal Sahay explains the whole situation and resigns. All the students request him not to leave and he shows some signs indicating that he would return.

Cast
 Shahid Kapoor as Rahul Prakash Udyavar, English teacher
 Nana Patekar as Principal Aditya Sahay
 Ayesha Takia as Anjali Mathur, nutritionist
 Swini Khara as Swini Srivastav
 Dwij Yadav as Vijay Damodhar
 Master Ali Haji as Rohan Ahuja
 Avika Gor as Avika
 Sushant Singh as Vijendra Chauhan, sports teacher
 Saurabh Shukla as School Manager Lallan Sharma
 Nassar Abdulla as Trustee Dholakia
 Shraddha Arya as Natasha "Nats" Singh
 Sanatan Modi as Farooque Sir, teacher
 Anjan Srivastav as Waghmare
 Vicky Ahuja as Rajveer Bahl
 Preeti Koppikar as Mrs. Shinde, Marathi teacher
 Sunny Singh as Vikram "Vicky" Bhatnagar
 Sushmita Mukherjee as Mrs. Bose, Geography teacher
 Kainaz Motivala as Shailey
 Denzil Frank (appearance in Aye Khuda Song)
 Manas Adhiya as Nutty
 Kurush Deboo as Cyrus Hansotia, Teacher
 Sagar Kale as Damodhar

Production
Most of Paathshaala was shot at Film City in Mumbai where the set of the Saraswati Vidya Mandir school was constructed.

Music
The audio CD was released in March 2010. It contains 10 songs, including five original songs, four remixes, and one theme song. The song "Mujhe Teri" is based on the Nepali song "Timro Tyo" which was sung by Akansha Lama. She got to sing the Hindi version.

"Aye Khuda" (Salim Merchant) – 4:42
"Khushnuma" (Vishal Dadlani) – 3:26
"Bekarar" (Lucky Ali, Abrar-ul-Haq) – 4:24
"Mujhe Teri" (Tulsi Kumar, Hanif Sheikh, Akansha Lama) – 4:07
"Teri Marzi Aye Khuda" (Kailash Kher) – 4:41
"Aye Khuda" – Remix (Salim Merchant) – 5:29
"Mujhe Teri" – Remix (Tulsi Kumar, Hanif Sheikh, Akansha Lama) – 4:24
"Teri Marzi Aye Khuda" – Remix (Kailash Kher) – 4:07
"Bekarar" – Remix (Lucky Ali) – 4:06
"Paathshaala" – Theme

Reception

Critical reception
Paathshaala received mixed reviews from top critics in India. It received 3 out of 5 from Indiatimes. The Times of India also gave the film 3 out of 5 saying, "Go for some serious viewing." AOL India's Noyon Jyoti Parasara gave the film a mere 1.5 out of 5 and said, "Paathshaala does not have a screenplay. And it has bad dialogues made only worse by loud acting by most of the cast." Indiafm's Taran Adarsh gave 2 out of 5 saying, "On the whole, Paathshaala is a well-intentioned film, but lacks clarity thanks to an uninspiring screenplay." Paathshaala was given 1.5 out of 5 by Rajeev Masand of CNN-IBN. According to him, "the script includes sheer melodrama and over-exaggeration in its effort to shamelessly manipulate you into caring for its characters."

Box office
The movie received a grand opening all over India. Ajmer, Jaipur, Jodhpur, and Udaipur started with 40–70 percent which went higher in subsequent shows. In Hyderabad, Punjab and Indore it opened to 50–60 percent and was expected to go up. In Mumbai Cinemax, Fun Republic and Fame Adlabs also received a good turnover on the opening day. Paathshaala grossed around  10 crore net over its first week. The film started slow but managed to pick at places on Saturday and remained steady on the lower side over the weekdays. Although the second week was initially projected to earn more at the box office, earnings increased 70% and the film was declared a "Average hit.

References

External links

Paathshaala Reviews 
Paathshaala – Trailer
The making of Paathshaala

2010 films
2010s Hindi-language films
Films shot in India
Films about the education system in India